Rob Lougheed (born 1947) is a politician from Alberta, Canada.

Lougheed was born in Grande Prairie in 1947 and attended the University of Alberta.  He was elected to the Legislative Assembly of Alberta in the 1997 general election as the member for Clover Bar-Fort Saskatchewan.  Running under the Progressive Conservative banner, he defeated incumbent Muriel Abdurahman of the Alberta Liberal Party. He was easily reelected to another term in 2001.

In the 2004 Alberta general election, Lougheed was re-elected in the new district of Strathcona. He  retired from the Assembly at dissolution in 2008.

External links
Rob Lougheed homepage

1947 births
Progressive Conservative Association of Alberta MLAs
Living people
21st-century Canadian politicians